Gyeongnam FC (Hangul: 경남 FC) is a South Korean professional football club based in South Gyeongsang Province that competes in the K League 2, the second tier of South Korean football. Its home stadium is the Changwon Football Center, located in Changwon. Gyeongnam FC was founded in 2006 and joined the K League as its 14th club for the 2006 season.

History

Gyeongnam FC finished in twelfth place in the 2006 K League, their first-ever participation in the top flight, and achieved third place in the Hauzen Cup. Under the manager Park Hang-seo, the club then finished fourth in the 2007 K League, but were defeated by the Pohang Steelers after a penalty shoot-out in the first round of the play-offs. Cabore became that season's K League top scorer with 18 goals in 26 matches, but left for FC Tokyo after the season.

Before the start of the 2008 season, Cho Kwang-rae was appointed as manager. The team signed Seo Sang-min and Brazilian attacking midfielder Índio, who filled the gap left by Cabore. The team failed to reach the play-off by losing to Jeonbuk Motors in the last match of the 2008 K League. However, they reached the 2008 Korean FA Cup final thanks to Kim Dong-chan's continuous scoring, including a hat-trick in the semi-final, but were defeated by the Pohang Steelers, thus failing to enter the AFC Champions League. In 2010, Gyeongnam FC moved from the Changwon Civil Stadium to Changwon Football Center.

In 2014, Gyeongnam FC was relegated to the second-tier K League Challenge after finishing the 2014 season in eleventh place, and then losing in the relegation play-offs against Gwangju FC. The team then spent three seasons in the second division, before winning the 2017 K League Challenge and thus achieving promotion back to the top tier. In their first season after coming back, Gyeongnam FC finished in second place, their highest-ever finish in K League, and therefore qualified for the 2019 AFC Champions League. However, the following season, they finished eleventh and were again relegated back to the second division. Manager Kim Jong-boo resigned as a result, and was replaced by Seol Ki-hyeon.

Players

Current squad

Out on loan

Captains

Former players
For details on former players, see :Category:Gyeongnam FC players.

Coaching staff

Honours

League
 K League 1
Runners-up (1): 2018

 K League 2
Winners (1): 2017

Cups
 FA Cup
Runners-up (2): 2008, 2012

Season-by-season records

AFC Champions League record
All results (home and away) list Gyeongnam's goal tally first.

Managerial history

References

External links

  

 
Association football clubs established in 2006
K League 2 clubs
Football clubs in South Gyeongsang Province
2006 establishments in South Korea
K League 1 clubs